"Secrets" is the fifth television play episode of the first season of the American television series CBS Playhouse. The episode tells the story of Doris Gray, a wife who believes her husband is hiding something from her and details the way the secrets between the two threaten to split them apart.

The episode aired in May 1968, and received an Emmy award nomination for Paul Bogart for direction.

References

External links 
 

1968 American television episodes
1968 plays
CBS Playhouse episodes